Ticos is a colloquial name for the natives of Costa Rica.

Tico, TICO or Ticos may also refer to:

People 
 Nicolae Tico (born 1953), Romanian sprint canoer
 Tico (footballer) (1977-2014), full name Alex Chandre de Oliveira, Brazilian footballer
 Onyekachi Okonkwo (born 1982), Nigerian footballer known as Tico
 Tico Brown (born 1957), American former professional basketball player, nicknamed "Tico"
 Tico McNutt, American animal research and founder of the Wild Dog Research Project, nicknamed "Tico"
 Hector Perez, American attorney and 9th national commissioner of the Boy Scouts of America (2008–2016), nicknamed "Tico"
 Tico Santa Cruz, stage name of Luis Guilherme Brunetta Fontenelle de Araújo (born 1977), frontman of Brazilian rock band Detonautas Roque Clube
 Tico Torres, (born 1953), American drummer and percussionist for Bon Jovi
 Tico Wells, African-American actor
 Tico Zamora (born 1967), American rock musician, songwriter and record producer

Fictional characters 
 Rose Tico, in Star Wars: The Last Jedi
 Tico the Squirrel, on the children's television series Dora the Explorer
 title orca character of Tico of the Seven Seas, a Japanese anime series
 Tico, in the Spanish animated series Around the World with Willy Fog

Other uses 
 Daewoo Tico, a compact Korean car
 Tico Records, a record label
 Tico Sportswear, a Polish sportswear company
 Ticos Air, a planned Costa Rican airline which never commenced operations
 Los Ticos, a nickname for the Costa Rica national football team
 Hurricane Tico, which struck Mazatlán, Mexico, in 1983
 Tico (greyhound), a famous racing greyhound
 Tico salamander, a species native to Costa Rica
 Ticonderoga-class cruiser, a United States Navy class of guided-missile cruisers
  (nicknamed "Tico"), lead ship of the class
 Ticoş, a village in Romania
 Ticoș River, Romania
 Tico and the Triumphs, a band in which Paul Simon performed in his early career
 Training Institute of Central Ohio, a former youth prison in Columbus, Ohio
 Travel Industry Council of Ontario, Canadian non-profit
 TICO (codec) or Tiny IntoPIX Codec, a codec

See also
 Tico-Tico (born 1973), Mozambican footballer
 TECO (disambiguation)
 Tyco (disambiguation)
 Tycho (disambiguation)

Lists of people by nickname